Christopher Columbus Langdell (May 22, 1826 – July 6, 1906) was an American jurist and legal academic who was Dean of Harvard Law School from 1870 to 1895.

Dean Langdell's legacy lies in the educational and administrative reforms he made to Harvard Law School, a task he was entrusted with by President Charles Eliot. Before Langdell's tenure the study of law was a rather technical pursuit in which students were simply told what the law is. Langdell applied the principles of pragmatism to the teaching of law as a result of which students were compelled to use their own reasoning powers to understand how the law might apply in a given case. This dialectical process came to be called the case method and has been the primary method of pedagogy at American law schools ever since. The case method has since been adopted and improved upon by schools in other disciplines, such as business, public policy, and education. This innovation, coupled with Langdell's introduction of strictly meritocratic principles into the evaluation of candidates, has led him to be considered 'arguably the most influential teacher in the history of professional education in the United States'.

Life

Christopher Langdell was born in the town of New Boston, New Hampshire, of English and Scots-Irish ancestry. He studied at Phillips Exeter Academy in 1845–48, at Harvard College in 1848–50 and at Harvard Law School in 1851–54. As a student, he served as one of the Harvard Law School's first librarians. From 1854 to 1870 he practiced law in New York City. In January 1870 he received an invitation from Charles Eliot to take up the chair of Dane Professor of Law at Harvard Law School. Langdell accepted the offer and soon after became Dean of the Law Faculty, succeeding Theophilus Parsons, to whose Treatise on the Law of Contracts (1853) he had contributed as a student. As Dean he introduced sweeping changes to the curriculum of the Law school extending the length of the academic programme from one to two years and replacing the old-style lecture system with a new system of tuition which required a significantly greater level of engagement and input from students. He was elected a Fellow of the American Academy of Arts and Sciences in 1870 and received the degree of LL.D. in 1875.

Langdell resigned the deanship in 1895, in 1900 became Dane Professor Emeritus, and on July 6, 1906 died in Cambridge. In 1903 a chair in the law school was named in his honor and after his death the school's primary academic building, housing both the world's largest academic law library and classrooms, was named Langdell Hall.

Langdell made the Harvard Law School a success by remodeling its administration. 
In a private correspondence of April 13, 1915, Charles W. Eliot wrote: "the putting of Langdell in charge of the Law School was the best piece of work I did for Harvard University, except the reconstruction of the Medical school in [18]70 and [18]71, and the long fight for the development of the elective system."

Influence on legal teaching

Dean Langdell's greatest innovation was his introduction of the case method of instruction.
Until 1890, no other U.S. law school used this method, which is now standard. 
Moreover, the standard first-year curriculum at all American law schools — Contracts, Property, Torts, Criminal Law, and Civil Procedure — stands, mostly unchanged, from the curriculum Langdell instituted.

Langdell, who came from a relatively unknown family, was conscious of the fact that students from more privileged backgrounds often received higher grades in their coursework purely because of their family's wealth and social status.  Dean Langdell instituted the process of blind grading, now common at U.S. law schools, so that students already known by professors or from esteemed families would have no advantage over others.

Works

Selection of Cases on the Law of Contracts (1871, the first book used in the case system; enlarged, 1879)
A Selection of Cases on Sales of Personal Property (1872)
A Summary of Equity Pleading (1877, 2nd ed., 1883)
Cases in Equity Pleading (1883)
Brief Survey of Equity Jurisdiction (1905)

Further reading
 Chase, Anthony. "The Birth of the Modern Law School," American Journal of Legal History (1979) 23#4 pp 329–348 in JSTOR

 Kimball, Bruce A. The Inception of Modern Professional Education: C. C. Langdell, 1826–1906 (Chapel Hill: University of North Carolina Press, 2009) 429 pp. 
 Kimball, Bruce A. "The Proliferation of Case Method Teaching in American Law Schools: Mr. Langdell's Emblematic 'Abomination,' 1890-1915," History of Education Quarterly (2006) 46#2 pp 192–240 in JSTOR
 Kimball, Bruce A.  '"Warn Students That I Entertain Heretical Opinions, Which They Are Not To Take as Law': The Inception of Case Method Teaching in the Classrooms of the Early C.C. Langdell, 1870-1883," Law and History Review 17 (Spring 1999): 57-140. 
 LaPiana, William P. Logic and Experience: The Origin of Modern American Legal Education (1994)  excerpt and text search

References

Attribution:

External links

"Harvard Law School Deans throughout history", Harvard Law School

American legal scholars
American legal writers
New York (state) lawyers
1826 births
1906 deaths
Fellows of the American Academy of Arts and Sciences
Harvard Law School alumni
Deans of Harvard Law School
Phillips Exeter Academy alumni
Legal education in the United States
Burials at Mount Auburn Cemetery
Harvard College alumni